Hanna Shelekh (born 14 July 1993) is a Ukrainian athlete who competes in the pole vault. She competed in the Women's pole vault at the 2012 Summer Olympics.

References

1993 births
Living people
Sportspeople from Donetsk
Ukrainian female pole vaulters
Olympic athletes of Ukraine
Athletes (track and field) at the 2012 Summer Olympics
Athletes (track and field) at the 2010 Summer Youth Olympics